Ben Yehuda or Ben-Yehuda is a Hebrew-language surname or patronymic literally meaning "son of Yehuda". Notable people with this surname include:

Eliezer Ben-Yehuda, (1858-1922), Jewish Litvak lexicographer of Hebrew and newspaper editor
Hemda Ben-Yehuda (1873–1951), Jewish journalist and author, and wife of Eliezer Ben-Yehuda
Nachman Ben-Yehuda,  professor and former dean of the department of sociology and anthropology at the Hebrew University in Jerusalem, Israel
Nadav Ben Yehuda (born 1988), Israeli mountain climber, search and rescue professional, photographer, and speaker
Netiva Ben-Yehuda (1928–2011), Israeli author, editor, media personality, and commander in the pre-state Jewish underground, Palmach.
Ralli Ben-Yehuda (born 1934), Israeli Olympic gymnast
Yechezkel Landau  or Yechezkel ben Yehuda HaLevi Landau  (1713 –  1793), an influential authority in halakha (Jewish law)

See also
Bani Isra'il (disambiguation)
B'nai Israel (disambiguation)
Bar Yehuda
Ben-Israel

Hebrew-language surnames
Patronymic surnames